Resul Pookutty (born 30 May 1971) is an Indian film sound designer, sound editor and audio mixer. He won the Academy Award for Best Sound Mixing, along with Richard Pryke and Ian Tapp, for Slumdog Millionaire. Pookutty has worked in Hindi, Tamil, and Malayalam languages in addition to British films.

Early life
Born into a family in Vilakkupara, near Anchal about 40 km from Kollam, Kerala, India. He was the youngest of eight children. His father was a private bus ticket checker. Pookutty had to walk 6 km to the nearest school and study in the light of a kerosene lamp as his village had no electricity.

He did his bachelor's degree in physics from Milad-E-Sherief Memorial College, Kayamkulam during 1987–1990. He joined Government Law College, Thiruvananthapuram for studying Bachelor of Laws (LLB) degree, however, he was unable to complete it. In 1995, he graduated from Film and Television Institute of India in Pune. He wrote the remaining LLB exam papers and enrolled as an advocate in 2012. Pookutty said that it was his father's desire to make him an advocate.

Career

Pookutty moved to Mumbai after his graduation. He termed it as "a natural immigration as a graduate of the institute." He pointed out that "Ninety-five per cent of the technicians of the Mumbai film industry are alumni of FTII, Pune." Pookutty made his debut in sound design with the 1997 film Private Detective: Two Plus Two Plus One, directed by Rajat Kapoor. He got his big break with the critically acclaimed 2005 film Black, directed by Sanjay Leela Bhansali. He subsequently engineered sound for major productions like Musafir (2004), Zinda (2006), Traffic Signal (2007), Gandhi, My Father (2007), Saawariya (2007), Dus Kahaniyaan, Kerala Varma Pazhassi Raja (2009) and Enthiran (2010).

Personal life
Pookutty is married to Shadia. They have two children.

Filmography

Awards
 2019 : Golden Jury Film Award the best sound designing for Sax by Julius
 2016 : Golden Reel award the best sound for documentary India's Daughter
 2012 : Zee Cine Award for Best Sound Design for his work in Ra.One.
 2010 : National Film Award for Best Audiography for his work in Pazhassi Raja
 2010 : Honourary Doctorate (D.Litt.) by Sree Sankaracharya University of Sanskrit
 2010 : Padma Shri by Government of India
 2009 : Asianet Film Awards – Special Honour Jury Award
 2009 : Chakkulathamma Swaravarsha Award
 2009 : Bahadoor Award
 2009 : Academy Award for Best Sound Mixing along with Ian Tapp and Richard Pryke for his work in Slumdog Millionaire.
 2009 : BAFTA Award for Best Sound along with Glenn Freemantle, Richard Pryke, Tom Sayers and Ian Tapp for his work in Slumdog Millionaire.
2005 : Zee Cine Award for Best Audiography for his work in Musafir.

See also
List of Indian winners and nominees of the Academy Awards

References

External links

Official webpage

Resul Pookutty – Profile at Variety
Resul Pookutty – Filmography and Profile
Resul returns after winning the Oscar
Interview-chatting
Sound Resolution – Resul Pookutty talks about Resul Pookutty Foundation – Fried Eye

1970 births
Living people
Indian Muslims
Musicians from Kollam
Best Sound Mixing Academy Award winners
Best Sound BAFTA Award winners
Film musicians from Kerala
Government Law College, Thiruvananthapuram alumni
Film and Television Institute of India alumni
People from Kollam district
Recipients of the Padma Shri in arts
Indian sound designers
Indian Academy Award winners
21st-century Indian composers
Best Audiography National Film Award winners